The 1973–74 AHL season was the 38th season of the American Hockey League. The league renamed its divisions, and the "East" Division became the "North" Division, and the "West" Division became the "South" Division. Twelve teams played 76 games each in the schedule. The Rochester Americans finished first overall in the regular season. The Hershey Bears and won their fifth Calder Cup championship.

This was the final season for the Cleveland/Jacksonville Barons as well as for the Boston Braves.

Final standings
Note: GP = Games played; W = Wins; L = Losses; T = Ties; GF = Goals for; GA = Goals against; Pts = Points;

Scoring leaders

Note: GP = Games played; G = Goals; A = Assists; Pts = Points; PIM = Penalty minutes

 complete list

Calder Cup playoffs

Trophy and award winners
Team awards

Individual awards

Other awards

See also
List of AHL seasons

References
AHL official site
AHL Hall of Fame
HockeyDB

 
American Hockey League seasons
3
3